The Afghanistan national cricket team played the Ireland cricket team in Ireland in July 2012. The teams will play a four-day first-class match as part of the 2011-13 ICC Intercontinental Cup and two One Day Internationals (ODIs) as part of the 2011–13 ICC World Cricket League Championship. The Intercontinental Cup match will be played at Observatory Lane in Rathmines, while the two ODIs will be played at the Clontarf Cricket Club Ground in Dublin. Heading into the matches, Ireland led both the Intercontinental Cup and the World Cricket League Championship, while Afghanistan were second in the Intercontinental Cup and fifth in the World Cricket League Championship.

Squads

World Cricket League Championship

1st ODI

2nd ODI

Intercontinental Cup Match

References

2012 in Irish cricket
2012 in Afghan cricket
2012 in cricket